was a Japanese football club that played in the former Japan Football League between 1994 and 1996.

History
PJM Futures was founded in Hamamatsu, Shizuoka in 1987 as the team of PJM Japan, a company based on Paul J. Meyer's U.S. academy Success (the company name came from Meyer's initials). The club was later moved to Tosu, Saga in 1994,  in which it changed its name to Tosu Futures. This happened one year after joining the former Japan Football League's Division 2 (which was merged into a single JFL division in 1994). Saga Stadium was used as a temporary home ground until Tosu Stadium opened in 1996. In January, 1997, Tosu futures caught the withdrawal of PJM Japan and was dissolved. In February, 1997, Sagan Tosu was established.

Former players
 Hitoshi Morishita (1987-1996)
 Shigetatsu Matsunaga (1995-1996)
 Stephen Tataw (1995-1996)
 Sergio Batista (1993-1994)
 Hugo Maradona (1992-1994)
 Pedro Pasculli (1994)
 Héctor Enrique (1995)
 Dragiša Binić (1995)
 Zoran Milinković (1995)

Sagan Tosu
Defunct football clubs in Japan
Association football clubs established in 1987
Association football clubs disestablished in 1997
1987 establishments in Japan
1997 disestablishments in Japan
Japan Football League (1992–1998) clubs